Zeydl Shmuel-Yehuda Helman (c. 1855 – c. 1938), who often published under the pen name Hazman, was a Romanian Jewish actor, songwriter, journalist, and educator. In addition to working as an actor in the Yiddish theatre in Romania and in the United States, he wrote and published a large number of Yiddish theatre songs which were widely performed in the late nineteenth century, making him one of the earliest popular songwriters in the genre.

Biography
Helman was born in Iași, Romania in 1855. His birth name was Shmuel-Yehuda, but he took on the name Zeydl after a childhood illness. His father had been a Hazzan but died when Helman was young. His mother remarried and his stepfather wanted him to become a shoichet (ritual slaughterer), but due to his interest in music he became a Hazzan and music teacher in Jewish schools instead. Around 1890, he became an actor in the Yiddish theatre and began to compose many songs which became popular in Romania. He also taught himself German and Romanian and sometimes translated works from those languages into Yiddish.

In 1893 Abba Sheyngold brought Helman to the United States to become a Yiddish theatre actor there under the name Helmanesko. He played a few seasons in New York City and Philadelphia, including at the Romanian Opera House with Jacob Adler and at Boris Thomashefsky's theater. However, he could not get used to life there and soon returned to Romania. 

Upon returning to Iași he became very involved in literary and theater life once again. For some time in the 1890s he also quit the theater and became a Hazzan in a synagogue again, although he soon returned to Yiddish songwriting.

Although he was not really a socialist, he also worked as editor for the socialist magazines  and later  (not to be confused with the later newspaper of the same name Der Veker (Minsk)).

He became blind late in life and apparently died in Iași in 1938.

References

External links
 Yiddish lexicon entry on Zeydl Helman

1855 births
1930s deaths
Year of death uncertain
People from Iași
19th-century Romanian actors
Romanian Jews
Yiddish theatre performers
Jewish songwriters
Romanian poets
Yiddish-language poets
Romanian journalists